Will Keen (born 26 February 1994), known by his stage name Keeno, is a British record producer and DJ from Winchester, known for adding orchestral elements to drum and bass. His debut album, Life Cycle, was released on 30 June 2014 through Hospital Records' imprint label Med School. It entered the UK Albums Chart at number 198, the UK Dance Chart at number 13 and the UK Indie Chart at number 34. Keeno has also received airplay on BBC Radio 1 and 1Xtra drum and bass shows.

His song "Nocturne", released on 9 December 2013, was used as the title screen for the 2014 racing game Forza Horizon 2.

Keeno's second album, Futurist, was released on his 22nd birthday, 26 February 2016. The album's first instant grat single, "At Twilight", was released on 12 February 2016.

He released his third studio album, All The Shimmering Things, in November 2017. 

After the closure of Hospital Records' MedSchool imprint, Keeno was taken under contract with Hospital Records in 2019 and in March 2020, his first single, Troopers Peak / Old School Lane was released on the label. 
His fourth studio album, titled I Live I Learn is currently scheduled for release on 27 November 2020.

Personal life
From the age of seven, Keen took part in a choir. He went to Winchester College and later studied music at the University of Manchester, although he left in January 2015 prior to graduation in order to pursue his music career full-time.

Discography

Studio albums

Extended plays

Singles

Promotional singles

Other appearances

References

Remixers
English record producers
Living people
English drum and bass musicians
1994 births
Musicians from Bristol